The Enterobactericaea, Frequently Around STAXI and Integrases (EFASI RNA motif) is a conserved RNA structure that was discovered by bioinformatics.
EFASI motifs are found in some organisms in the lineage Enterobacteriaceae.

EFASI RNAs likely function in trans as small RNAs.  Many EFASI RNAs are found several hundred base pairs downstream of STAXI RNA motif examples and upstream of integrase-encoding genes.  Although this association likely relates to the function of EFASI RNAs, this function is not yet known.

References

Non-coding RNA